Zinc silicate may refer to:

 Hemimorphite, a zinc sorosilicate
 Willemite, a zinc neosilicate
 Sauconite a zinc phyllosilicate